HMS Mars was a 74-gun third rate ship of the line of the Royal Navy, launched on 15 March 1759 at Woolwich Dockyard.

Mars took part in the Battle of Quiberon Bay on 20 November 1759, flying the broad pennant of Commodore James Young.

From 1778, Mars was on harbour service, and was broken up in 1784.

Notes

References

Lavery, Brian (2003) The Ship of the Line - Volume 1: The development of the battlefleet 1650-1850. Conway Maritime Press. .

Ships of the line of the Royal Navy
Dublin-class ships of the line
1759 ships